Mähönen or Mahonen is a surname. Notable people with the surname include:

Krister Mähönen (born 1992), Finnish ice hockey player
Michael Mahonen (born 1964), Canadian actor, director, and screenwriter
Raimo Mähönen (born 1938), Finnish politician